The Malagasy slit-faced bat (Nycteris madagascariensis) is a species of slit-faced bat native to Madagascar. Very little is known about the species.

References

Nycteridae
Bats of Africa
Endemic fauna of Madagascar
Mammals of Madagascar
Mammals described in 1937
Taxa named by Guillaume Grandidier